The Professional Aviation Safety Specialists (PASS) is affiliated with the AFL–CIO through its affiliation with the Marine Engineers' Beneficial Association. It represents more than 11,000 Federal Aviation Administration's (FAA) Airway Transportation Systems Specialists and Department of Defense employees.

History

Founding and leadership
The union was founded in 1977 by Howard Johannssen, an FAA safety technician in the agency's Air Traffic Organization. National President David J. Spero is currently serving his first three-year term, having been elected in September 2021. Carlos Aguirre was elected national vice president in October 2018, and his title changed to secretary-treasurer later that year. Previous presidents of PASS include Johannssen (1977–1994), Jack Johnson (1994–1997), Mike Fanfalone (1997–2003), Tom Brantley (2003–2012), and Mike Perrone (2012-2021). 

Johannssen and 50 of his colleagues gathered in Chicago in February 1977 to form a union, fed up after years of second-class treatment at the FAA. An incident involving a fire at JFK International Airport pointed out the disparate treatment. Unable to unlock a door giving access to a hangar from which smoke was emanating, Johannssen grabbed a fire extinguisher to knock the door down. An air traffic controller saw what was happening and helped. After the incident, Johannssen was told he was facing a suspension for destroying government property. The air traffic controller was given a $500 reward. It was time to form a union.

In 1991, employees in the FAA's Flight Standards Service, part of Aviation Safety, voted to join the union.

Employees represented
Employees covered under PASS include systems specialists, flight standards and manufacturing aviation safety inspectors, aeronautical information professionals, flight inspection pilots, mission specialists, operations staff, aircraft maintenance employees, legal instruments examiners, compliance specialists and support staff.

NextGen
PASS-represented employees are instrumental in the successful implementation of the FAA's Next Generation Air Transportation System (NextGen) to modernization the nation's air traffic control system. “The NextGen portfolio encompasses the planning and implementation of innovative new technologies and airspace procedures after thorough testing for safety.”

As part of NextGen, in 2016, PASS members helped complete Standard Terminal Automation Replacement Program System (STARS) deployment at the11 largest TRACONs (terminal radar approach control facility) and air traffic control towers in the country.

PASS Fights Privatization

Throughout its history, PASS has fought efforts to privatize the nation's air traffic control system. In 2002, U.S. President George W. Bush signed an executive order allowing the government to hire a private entity to take over air traffic control functions Then-PASS President Fanfalone said the union’s “concern is that the radar that monitors our skies and the voice and radio systems that provide critical communication capabilities should be maintained and certified by committed public servants, answerable to the American people, and not controlled by private interests most concerned about a bottom line.”

In April 2015, the union, along with six other unions representing Federal Aviation Administration employees, sent a letter to the U.S. House of Representatives, arguing against proposals to privatize the FAA that came out a congressional hearing the previous month titled "Options for FAA Air Traffic Reform." PASS is opposed to proposals to privatize the nation’s air traffic control system. The United States has the safest, largest, and most complex aviation system in the world and that system should continue to be operated solely for the public’s benefit and safety, not for the benefit of a private entity.

In February 2016, the chair of the U.S. House Transportation and Infrastructure (T&I) Committee introduced legislation that would turn over the operation of the air traffic control system to a nongovernmental entity. In 2017, President Donald Trump announced his support for privatization of the FAA. Writing a month later in the New Jersey Star-Ledger, PASS President Perrone wrote: "This large-scale government reorganization would imperil the core mission of the interrelated segments of the FAA, which are devoted to maintaining safety and efficiency. Collaboration and interaction between every part of the FAA is essential to the success of our aviation system. The FAA manages the most complicated aviation system in the world; splitting the agency up disrupts this proven model and gambles with aviation safety." Efforts by PASS and other labor and industry groups led the T&I chair to abandon privatization in early 2018. Later that year, Congress passed a five-year reauthorization of the FAA which did not privatize the nation's air traffic control system. It was the first five-year reauthorization since 1982 and was signed into law on October 5, 2018.

Partial U.S. Government Shutdown

During the partial U.S. government shutdown that lasted from December 22, 2018 through January 25, 2019, thousands of PASS members at the FAA were furloughed during the first few weeks, including aviation safety inspectors, while thousands more were working without pay in airports and air traffic control facilities. The union mounted a public relations campaign, sponsoring informational pickets at airports across the U.S. and speaking to national and local media with the message for lawmakers: 'Don't Gamble With Aviation Safety.'

After the shutdown ended, PASS National President Perrone testified on Capitol Hill in front of the House Transportation and Infrastructure Committee, Aviation Subcommittee on February 3, 2019 on a panel "Putting U.S. Aviation Safety at Risk: The Impact of the Shutdown." The hearing was called to examine how the recent 35-day partial shutdown of the federal government impacted FAA functions and operations, as well as the U.S. aviation industry and workforce. During his testimony, President Perrone said that each passing day of the shutdown, “A layer of safety was stripped away and the system became exposed to more risk. For example, the FAA was not overseeing foreign repair stations [increasingly used by U.S. airlines] for 35 days and the world knew it. This is not an acceptable standard,” he said.

References

Trade unions established in 1977
Aviation trade unions
AFL–CIO